Euphaedra ubangi is a butterfly in the family Nymphalidae. It is found in Mongala in the Democratic Republic of the Congo.

References

Butterflies described in 1974
ubangi
Endemic fauna of the Democratic Republic of the Congo
Butterflies of Africa